Harry McCLellan Anderson (January 29, 1872 – June 14, 1957) was an American football coach.  He served as the sixth head football coach at West Virginia University in Morgantown, West Virginia and he held that position for the 1898 season.  His coaching record at West Virginia was 6–1.

Anderson also served as the head coach at Centre College in Danville, Kentucky during the 1896 and 1897 seasons.

Head coaching record

References

1872 births
1957 deaths
Centre Colonels football coaches
West Virginia Mountaineers football coaches
Princeton University alumni
West Virginia University alumni
People from Kanawha County, West Virginia